The Nova Scotia Supreme Court is a superior court in the province of Nova Scotia.

The Supreme Court consists of 25 judicial seats including the position of Chief Justice and Associate Chief Justice. At any given time there may be one or more additional justices who sit as supernumerary justices. The justices sit in 18 different locations around the province.

Jurisdiction
As with all superior courts across the country, the court is said to have inherent jurisdiction. It hears civil and criminal trials. The criminal trials can be judge alone or judge and jury. The court will also hear appeals from the provincial court, small claims court, Family court, and various provincial tribunals.

Appeals of Supreme Court decisions are then made to the Nova Scotia Court of Appeal.

History 

While the first court administering the Common Law was established in Annapolis Royal in 1721, the creation of a Supreme Court took place on October 21, 1754, several years before the Province was granted a legislative assembly.   The court  is the oldest court in Canada and is among the oldest in North America.

Jonathan Belcher was appointed the first Chief Justice of the Nova Scotia Supreme Court. The court's jurisdiction extended to the entire colony, which, after the Treaty of Paris ended the war with France in 1763, includes present day Prince Edward Island, New Brunswick and eastern Maine.

In 1990, on the recommendation of the Nova Scotia Court Structure Task Force, the County and Supreme courts were merged to create a bench of 25 judges at the trial level. Since 1999, the Supreme Court also administers the Nova Scotia Family Division Court, with eight judges, that has jurisdiction over divorces and other family law cases in the Halifax and industrial Cape Breton.

Supreme Court Family Division
The Supreme Court includes the Family Division which adjudicates matters of family law in the regions of Halifax and Cape Breton. As Supreme Court Justices, they have authority over both divorce as well as all other family law matters, unlike their provincial court counterparts who do not have the federal authority to adjudicate divorces.

Justices of the Supreme Court

Past Judges

Judges of the Supreme Court Family Division

References

External links
Supreme Court of Nova Scotia Official Website
 composition of current Judicial Advisory Committee

Nova Scotia courts
Nova_Scotia
1750s establishments in Nova Scotia
Courts and tribunals established in 1754